Huia is an extinct New Zealand bird species.

Huia may also refer to:
 Huia (frog), a frog genus
 Huia (plant), a genus of extinct plants
 Huia, New Zealand, a settlement in West Auckland
 Huia River, in the West Coast region of the South Island of New Zealand
 9488 Huia, a main-belt asteroid
 Huia Publishers, a publishing company
 "Huia", a song by Upper Hutt Posse from Legacy
 Te Huia, a passenger train service in New Zealand

People with the surname
 Maria Te Huia, a former New Zealand soccer player

People with the given name
 Huia Edmonds (born 1981), an Australian rugby union footballer
 Huia Samuels, a fictional character in television series Shortland Street

See also
 Waka huia, treasure containers made by Māori
 Ngāti Huia, a Māori tribe
 Hui (disambiguation)